Antonio Aloisi (born 28 August 1968) is an Italian retired footballer and active manager. He played for most of his career for Ascoli in the Italian Serie A.

References

1968 births
Living people
People from Ascoli Piceno
Italian footballers
Italian football managers
Ascoli Calcio 1898 F.C. players
Torino F.C. players
Cagliari Calcio players
A.C. Cesena players
Reggina 1914 players
Reggina 1914 managers
Ascoli Calcio 1898 F.C. managers
U.S. Avellino 1912 managers
Serie A players
Serie B players
Association football defenders
Sportspeople from the Province of Ascoli Piceno
Footballers from Marche